The Doubles' sprint competition at the 2019 FIL World Luge Championships was held on 25 January 2019.

Results
The qualification was held at 09:00 and the final at 13:44.

References

Doubles' sprint